CNN World News, a program that airs on CNN International and CNN International Asia Pacific. It is supplemented by CNN World News Asia and CNN World News Europe The show's traditional time run is 24-hours if it is followed by CNN World News Middle East The show's regular presenters include Errol Barnett. Its main role is to update viewers of the latest news in the world. It contains a weather update from the CNN World Weather Forecast News. CNN World News can usually air up to three times on weekends, and is known to be bringing the latest on a story.

Regular presenters 
Errol Barnett

Schedule
Daily:
24-hours (all times EST) – Errol Barnett (North America)
24-hours (all times HKT) – Errol Barnett (Asia Pacific)
24-hours (all times UTC) – Paula Hancocks (Europe)

International broadcasts outside United States

In Singapore, it is broadcast live on MediaCorp TV Channel 5 daily at 6:00–6:30 am.

In Hong Kong, it is broadcast live on ATV World and TVB Pearl daily at 7:30–8:00 am.

In Indonesia, it is broadcast live on RCTI (relayed on RCTI; recorded on SCTV (simulcast on RCTI)) and SCTV (relayed on RCTI; recorded on RCTI (simulcast on SCTV)); carrying simulcast relayed and recorded network on RCTI daily at 05:30–06:00 am.

Simulcast in the International
International simulcast relay network Radio and Television on CNN International News Asia Pacific such : 
Television
  : RCTI (recorded on SCTV in 1997 and now recorded on JakTV and MNC International)/SCTV (recorded on RCTI in 1997)/JakTV (recorded on RCTI and MNC International)/CNN Indonesia
  : TV1/TV Kuala Lumpur/TV Selangor
  : MediaCorp TV Channel 5/MediaCorp HD5
  : RTB TV2
  : DZKB-TV
  : Shanghai International Television
  : ViuTVsix
  : TrueVisions
  : CNN 
Radio:
  : Radio Elshinta News and Talk
  : Klasik Nasional FM/Kuala Lumpur FM/Selangor FM/Suara Malaysia/Radio24
  : CNA938
  : Radio News in English
  : China English International News Radio
  : Radio Hong Kong National News in English/Radio Hong Kong International News in English
  : IRN/USA Radio Network

1980s American television news shows
English-language television shows
CNN original programming